The Bernard H.V.42 was a racing seaplane designed by Société des Avions Bernard for the French government for use of the French Schneider Trophy team.

Design and development
Three H.V.42s were ordered by the French government for use as trainers for the French Schneider Trophy team at Lake Berre. Similar to the earlier H.V.41 they were streamlined single-seat cantilever monoplanes with twin floats. The first H.V.42 flew in March 1931 and was soon joined by the other two. Marked as "1" "2" and "3" they were used during the summer of 1931 to train the French team for the 1931 race.

Specifications

See also

Notes

Bibliography

1930s French sport aircraft
Schneider Trophy
Floatplanes
HV042
Single-engined tractor aircraft
Low-wing aircraft
Aircraft first flown in 1931